Vilhelm Laybourn (3 August 1885 – 4 April 1955) was a Danish modern pentathlete. He competed at the 1912 Summer Olympics.

References

External links
 

1885 births
1955 deaths
Danish male modern pentathletes
Olympic modern pentathletes of Denmark
Modern pentathletes at the 1912 Summer Olympics
People from Gentofte Municipality
Sportspeople from the Capital Region of Denmark